All-news radio is a radio format devoted entirely to the discussion and broadcast of news.

All-news radio is available in both local and syndicated forms, and is carried on both major US satellite radio networks. All-news stations can run the gamut from simulcasting an all-news television station like CNN, to a "rip and read" headline service, to stations that include live coverage of news events and long-form public affairs programming.

Many stations brand themselves Newsradio but only run news during the morning and afternoon drive times, or in some cases, broadcast talk radio shows with frequent news updates.  These stations are properly labeled as "news/talk"  stations. Also, some National Public Radio stations identify themselves as News and Information stations, which means that in addition to running the NPR news magazines such as Morning Edition and All Things Considered, they run other information and public affairs programs.

History

In 1960 KJBS radio in San Francisco, California, became KFAX and changed formats from a blend of music, news, and sports to trial the concept of a "newspaper of the air". The call letters reflected the word facts. However, this experiment proved unsuccessful.

Broadcasting pioneer Arthur W. Arundel is credited with establishing the first 24-hour all-news station in the United States in January 1961 on his owned-and-operated WAVA in Washington, D.C. The station met with success amongst an audience in the capital city then riveted to news of the Vietnam War and of the assassinations of President John F. Kennedy, Martin Luther King and Robert F. Kennedy.  Arundel helped other stations in New York and Chicago to convert to his "All News, All the Time" format and then met direct competition from Washington Post-owned WTOP/1500 in 1969.

Radio programmer Gordon McLendon, who has been credited with pioneering top 40, all-sports, beautiful music and telephone talk formats, is also an acknowledged pioneer in the all-news format. XTRA News went on the air May 5, 1961, from XETRA, a station licensed to Tijuana, Mexico, whose 50,000-watt signal could be heard in San Diego and Los Angeles.  Not long after, WNUS debuted in Chicago (the NUS in the call letters standing for "news").

XETRA had no outside reporters and got all of its local news from the AP and UPI wire services. Both stations operated using a 15-minute news cycle with newscasts repeated every 15 minutes.

Another early prototypical all-news format operated through WABC-FM in New York City during the 114-day 1962 New York City newspaper strike which lasted from December 8, 1962, to March 31, 1963. The format only lasted as long as the strike, though, and the station reverted to its regular format of Broadway show tunes and simulcasting of its AM sister station afterwards.  The following year, ABC's Detroit FM station, WXYZ-FM, made a similar effort during a newspaper strike.  Both stations, which previously had simulcast their AM sister stations, carried ABC Radio Network news programs (including those not heard on the AM Top 40 stations), AM local newscasts plus wire service stories read to fill the balance of the time.

Group W, the broadcast division of Westinghouse, adopted an all-news format 20-minute cycle that eschewed network newscasts so that local and non-local news could be freely mixed, according to what appeared more interesting or important on any given day. Westinghouse also used field reporters at its all-news stations, which included 1010 WINS New York, KYW Newsradio 1060 Philadelphia and KFWB News 98 Los Angeles. WINS began broadcasting its all-news format in April 1965. A second New York all-news station, CBS-owned WCBS, began all-news programming on August 28, 1967 (although its first broadcasts were on its FM sister station after a plane crashed into its tower, knocking the AM station off the air). CBS converted some of its other AM outlets to this WCBS "Newsradio" format over the next several months and years, including WBBM Chicago, KCBS San Francisco, KNX Los Angeles and WEEI/590 Boston (which CBS sold in the 1980s).

In 1975 the NBC Radio Network shut down its profitable weekend music- and information-service NBC Monitor to launch the "News & Information Service" (NIS), the first all-news radio network. It closed two years later in a cost-cutting move, though it had strong ratings in some markets.

In 1994 Associated Press launched an effort similar to NIS. Officially known as AP All-News Radio, it had affiliates from coast to coast.  However, it was informally better known by its promotional title of "The News Station".  Associated Press discontinued the all-news format in July 2005. However, the Associated Press continue to offer top-of-the-hour updates, which are streamed 24/7 online.

In 2003, Fox News began syndicating one-minute radio updates to radio stations via syndication service Westwood One. Some years later, Fox opted to make a full foray into network radio news services. On June 1, 2005, Fox News Radio employed 60 people and provided hourly five-minute newscasts and a one-minute newscast half-hourly. At its launch, 60 stations participated in the network, with more joining under a deal struck between Fox and Clear Channel Communications (now iHeartMedia). This allowed many Clear Channel stations to carry Fox News Radio newscasts and allowed Fox News Radio to use and nationally distribute news content produced by Clear Channel, with several of those stations ending decades-long relationships dating back to the Golden Age of Radio with ABC News Radio (now owned by competitor Cumulus Media) and CBS Radio News to carry Fox News Radio.

Fox also produces Fox News Talk, with talk radio programs featuring Fox News personalities. The programs are broadcast on terrestrial radio stations in the U.S. as well as a dedicated channel on SiriusXM Satellite Radio's digital platform on Channel 450.

The national audio feed of CNN Headline News, began a long phaseout in 2007. Headline News's audio feed was popular among some all-news stations, particularly after the AP disbanded the format in 2005, until the TV network decided in 2006 to abandon its all-news format and add talk-show programming in prime time, when many smaller stations do not have air staff and rely on a network feed. Most of the Headline News affiliates became talk-radio stations, with a handful of daytime-only stations keeping the feed. CNN also for a time offered a second all-news channel with the hour filled with CNN Radio newscasts on the hour and half-hour and business, sports and feature segments from CNN Radio and Headline News at specific points each hour, plus time segments for local news to be inserted. Many smaller affiliates, however, preferred Headline News audio which was more suited to turn-key (or unattended, automated) operation. CNN Radio ceased operations April 1, 2012, although CNN continues to stream an advertisement-supported audio simulcast of CNN on TuneIn.

While not a full-time NIS, the CBS Radio Network provides significant content for most all-news radio stations in the United States. WestwoodOne offers two morning news magazines (First Light and America in the Morning) on weekdays, which many talk radio stations air at 4 a.m. or 5 a.m.  The network's mobile app also contains a 24/7 stream featuring rolling news and features on a set schedule, along with breaking news coverage.

All-news has for years been a top-rated radio format in New York, Washington, D.C., and other cities, but as big-city traffic worsens and people work longer hours that increase the urgency of planning their day ahead, the focus of such stations has increasingly turned to traffic and to weather, updated every 10 minutes.  Attempts at long-form commercial all-news stations, such as Washington Post Radio, have been largely unsuccessful.

A newcomer to all-news in the early 2010s, Randy Michaels, acquired FM stations in New York, Chicago and Philadelphia (through his Merlin Media company) in preparation for all-news formats in those cities (the Philadelphia station never made the switch and instead aired talk shows). Michaels gave up on the format after approximately one year (after an attempt to add 'conversational breaks' discussing the news), and changed formats on both the New York and Chicago stations to music, later selling the stations.

Talk Radio Network launched America's Radio News Network, a 15-hour weekday block of news, in January 2011; the company had been launching three-hour news blocks in specific dayparts since January 2009. The network was syndicated mostly to smaller stations in need of turnkey news operations during the day; the network never produced programming for overnights or weekends. The service shut down in September 2013.

In 2012 Cumulus Media added more all-news hours on KGO in San Francisco and KLIF in Dallas under the branding "News & Information", but both stations have since changed to a news-talk format due to audience and talk staff rejection of the all-news programming as presented on the stations, accompanied by staff reductions due to budget cuts.

In 2016 "24/7 News" on the iHeart app was renamed NBC Newsradio. It also carries a second all-news network, AP Radio News.

In late 2015, Fox News Radio began offering Fox News Headlines 24/7 exclusively to SiriusXM subscribers on Channel 115. The program is a live-anchored all-news radio channel offering news, sports, entertainment and social media discussion in fifteen-minute blocks. It is a companion channel to the audio simulcasts of the Fox News Channel on SiriusXM 114 and Fox Business on SiriusXM 113.  The channel draws heavily from the newsgathering resources of Fox News Radio's two terrestrial radio networks.

TuneIn offers audio simulcasts of several television networks, including CNN, MSNBC, CNBC, and Fox News, along with 'commercial-free' feeds (in reality, extra network features overlaid over commercial advertising) through its Premium tier.

Stations
For a near-complete list of News/Talk radio stations, see Category:News and talk radio stations

Many all-news stations only operate as such during the daytime, or may preempt news with live sports coverage. To be included in this list, a station must broadcast all-news programming during a majority of a normal broadcast day.

All-news stations and networks in the United States
WBZ: Boston, Massachusetts (CBS News Radio) (all-news 5 a.m. to 8 p.m. only)
WXIS: Bristol, Virginia (CBS News Radio)
WBBM and WCFS-FM: Chicago, Illinois (CBS News Radio)
KRLD: Dallas, Texas (CBS News Radio) (all-news weekdays and weekend mornings only)
WWJ: Detroit, Michigan (CBS News Radio)
WGL: Fort Wayne, Indiana (CBS News Radio)
WNUZ-LP: Gap, Pennsylvania (Pacifica Radio)
WKVI: Knox, Indiana (ABC News Radio)
KNX and KNX-FM: Los Angeles, California (CBS News Radio)
WCBS: New York, New York (CBS News Radio)
WINS and WINS-FM: New York, New York (ABC News Radio)
KYW and WPHI-FM: Philadelphia, Pennsylvania (CBS News Radio)
KCBS and KFRC-FM: San Francisco, California (CBS News Radio)
KNWN and KNWN-FM: Seattle, Washington (ABC News Radio)
WTOP-FM: Washington, D.C. (CBS News Radio)
ABC News Radio: national
Associated Press Radio: national
Black Information Network: national
CBS News Radio: national
Fox News Headlines: national
NBC News Radio: national

All-news stations in Australia
ABC NewsRadio – national (Australian Broadcasting Corporation)

All-news stations in Brazil
BandNews FM – news every 20 minutes
CBN and Radio Bandeirantes – two stations broadcast news 24/7
Jovem Pan News – news for Brasilia
Rádio Itatiaia – regional news for Belo Horizonte
Rádio Jornal – regional news for Recife
Rádio Gaúcha, Rádio Guaíba and Pampa FM – regional news for Porto Alegre

All-news stations in Canada
Between 1977 and 1989 Canada All News Limited operated Canada's first attempt at all news radio with a network of eight FM stations and one AM station in major Canadian cities, all using the base callsign CKO (or CK News).  The effort was similar in some ways to NBC Radio's News and Information Service, mostly national news programming with cut-ins for individual stations to broadcast local news.  The network was also the first to offer live broadcasts of Question Time in the Canadian parliament.  The network was plagued by low ratings and poor advertising sales (similar to problems faced by all-news radio networks operated by NBC, CNN and AP in the US).  Ironically, many of the stations listed below operate in cities which CKO News had served previously.

News-talk radio stations 570 News in Kitchener/Waterloo, Ontario, News 95.7 in Halifax (also Rogers Broadcasting-owned stations) use an all-news wheel for their morning and afternoon shows, simulating their sister station, 680News in Toronto.

In February 2001, Corus Entertainment launched an all-news sister station to Vancouver news-talk station CKNW. All news NW2 (CJNW AM730, formerly CKLG) was branded as "24 hour news radio, powered by CKNW." NW2 shared newsroom resources with CKNW, including several anchors and reporters. However, NW2 did not achieve broad appeal, and was shut down in May 2002. The station currently airs an all-traffic format under the call sign CHMJ. That same year, Corus acquired two all-news stations in Montreal, CINW ("940 News") at 940 AM in English and CINF ("Info 690") at 690 AM in French, which had launched in late 1999. These frequencies were previously operated by the Canadian Broadcasting Corporation's English and French radio services respectively before the public broadcaster switched to the FM dial. But as AM radio listenership in Montreal declined sharply in recent years – only longtime talk-radio stations CJAD in English and CKAC in French (now an all-traffic station) remained popular – neither CINW nor CINF were able to make a profit (even after several format changes on CINW), and Corus finally shut down both stations on January 29, 2010.

All-news stations in China
Beijing Newsradio FM100.6  AM828 (Beijing)
Zhejiang Newsradio FM98.8  AM1530 (Hangzhou)
Dong Guang Newsradio FM 90.9  AM 1296 (Shanghai)
Tianjin Newsradio FM97.2  AM909 (Tianjin)

All-news stations in Cuba
 Radio Reloj – the world's oldest all news station, broadcasting live news and information 24/7 with continuous clock ticks in the background and a beep every minute

All-news stations in France
France Info
BFM Business – business information
Euronews Radio

All-news stations in Germany
Most all news stations in Germany are operated by the local public broadcasters in the different states. All of these stations (except NDR Info) carry ARD-Infonacht produced by MDR Aktuell during the overnight hours.

Deutschlandfunk (DLF) in all of Germany by Deutschlandradio
SWR Aktuell (Formerly: SWR cont.ra, SWR info) in Baden-Württemberg an Rhineland-Palatinat broadcast by Südwestrundfunk
 Inforadio from Broadcasting Berlin/Brandenburg Rundfunk Berlin-Brandenburg
BR24 (formerly: B5 aktuell (B5 up-to-date)) from Bavarian Broadcasting Bayerischer Rundfunk
hr-info from Hessian Broadcasting Hessischer Rundfunk
MDR Aktuell (formerly: MDR Info) from Central German Broadcasting Mitteldeutscher Rundfunk
NDR Info from North German Broadcasting Norddeutscher Rundfunk
Euronews Radio

All-news stations in Ireland
 RTÉ Radio 1 is a mixed-genre service but it provides the most comprehensive news and current affairs coverage in the country.

All-news stations in Israel
 Reshet Bet — currently operated by the Israeli Broadcasting Corporation
 Galey Tzahal – operated by The Israel Defense Forces

All-news stations in Italy
Radio 24 – the main Italian private all-news radio, owned by the economical newspaper Il Sole 24 Ore
Babboleo News – first local Italian all-news radio in Genoa, Liguria.
Euronews Radio

All-news stations in Malaysia
Radio24 (Malaysia) – all news station operated by state news agency, BERNAMA

All-news stations in Mexico
XEDA-FM - Imagen Radio 90.5 FM Mexico City
XEW-FM - W Radio 96.9 FM in Mexico City
XHDL-FM - Heraldo Radio 98.5 FM in Mexico City
XHMVS-FM - MVS 102.5 FM in Mexico City
XERFR-FM - Radio Fórmula 103.3 FM in Mexico City
XEDF-FM/XEDF-AM - Radio Fórmula 104.1 FM / 1500 AM in Mexico City
XEAI-AM - Radio Fórmula 1470 AM in Mexico City
XHBI-FM - BI Noticias 88.7 FM in Aguascalientes City, Aguascalientes
XEF-AM - Activa 1420 AM in Ciudad Juárez, Chihuahua
XEYC-AM - Radio Fórmula Juárez 1460 AM in Ciudad Juárez, Chihuahua
XECJC-AM - Radio Net 1490 AM in Ciudad Juárez, Chihuahua
XEJPV-AM- W Radio 1560 AM in Ciudad Juárez, Chihuahua
XHACE-FM/XEACE-AM - Radio Fórmula Mazatlán 91.3 FM / 1470 AM in Mazatlán, Sinaloa
XESTN-AM - Universal y La Octava - 1540 AM in Monterrey, Nuevo León
XEOR-AM - NotiGape 1390 AM in Reynosa, Tamaulipas
XERCN-AM - RCN 1470 AM in Tijuana, Baja California
XEPE-AM - Heraldo Radio 1700 AM in Tijuana, Baja California

All-news stations in Nepal
 Image News FM – "All news. Always news."

All-news stations in the Netherlands
BNR Nieuwsradio – non-stop live news and info
NPO Radio 1 – news, sports and events

All-news stations in Norway
 NRK Alltid nyheter - NRK's All-News Station

All-news stations in the Philippines
The all-news radio format in the country is largely credited as having started in 1968 at the height of that year's Casiguran earthquake that notably toppled the Ruby Tower in Manila. Starting out on the AM band, FM started to become a successful nationwide prospective trend in 2009.

AM Band
Almost all AM stations in large broadcast markets of the Philippines are all-news stations while smaller markets employ a full-service format. The stations listed are flagship stations based in Manila.
DWIZ 882
GMA Super Radyo DZBB 594
RMN DZXL 558 kHz
DZRH – The oldest radio station. 
ABS-CBN DZMM Radyo Patrol 630 (Currently Suspended due to a government-ordered shut-down but is airing its programs live via the internet)
Radyo Pilipinas 1 738
Radyo Agila DZEC 1062
DZRJ 810 AM Radyo Bandido
Aksyon Radyo (10 originating provincial stations in large radio markets)
 Sonshine Radio 1026 AM
 DZAS 702 AM
 Radyo Veritas 846
 GV AM 792 Pampanga
 Bombo Radyo (does not have an AM station in Manila but maintains its Makati newscenter and 20 originating provincial stations in large radio markets)
 Radyo Ukay (6 originating Mindanao stations in large radio markets)
 Radyo Ronda (13 originating provincial stations in large radio markets)
 Radyo Asenso (15 originating provincial stations in large radio markets)

FM Band
Prior to 2009, the format was experimental on independent provincial FM stations and were mostly operated via time-brokerage until key stations in the country began a trend on operating all-news radio networks on FM, though the earlier practice still has considerable extent in smaller radio markets.
This foray has a major advantage from the long-standing "news-intensive AM" because of high-quality broadcasting and penetrates all locations, unlike the older AM transmissions that are prone to electrical and other signal interference.

As of December 2018, six major network operators have their distinction of this format on the FM band.

TV5 Network, Inc. (November 8, 2010–present)
Radyo Singko News FM (three originating stations and four relay stations in large radio markets)
Brigada Mass Media Corporation (October 18, 2009 – present)
Brigada News FM (50 provincial originating stations and 10 provincial relay stations of Palawan Province (including: Brooke's Point, Coron, Narra, Quezon, Roxas and Taytay), Zambales (including Iba and Palauig), Camarines Sur (including Goa), and Tacurong, Sultan Kudarat in large and mid-sized radio markets)
 Radyo Bandera News Philippines (2015–present)
 Radyo Bandera News FM/Radyo Bandera Sweet FM (32 owned and operated stations and 20 affiliates in mid-sized markets)
 Sagay Broadcasting Corporation (2011–present)
 Muews Radio (10 stations in various large and mid-sized radio markets)
 Philippine Collective Media Corporation (2020–present)
 FMR Philippines (50 provincial originating stations (example: 100.7 Tacloban) and 6 relay stations in Eastern Visayas (including 101.7 Borongan, 91.7 Catarman, 106.9 Catbalogan, 100.7 Ormoc, 88.5 Calbayog and 96.5 Maasin) in various large and mid-sized radio markets)
 Yes2Health Advertising, Inc. (2022–present)
 XFM Philippines (32 owned and operated stations and affiliates in mid-sized markets)

All-news stations in Poland
 Polskie Radio Info - Polskie Radio's All-News station from 1993 to 1994
 Polskie Radio 24 - Polskie Radio's All-News station from 2010
 Tok FM - commercial news and talk station with bulletins every 20 minutes between 5 am and midnight on weekdays, and 7 am and midnights on weekends with headlines only on :20 and :40.

All-news stations in Russia
Kommersant FM – all-news station from newspaper Kommersant
Business FM

All-news stations in South Korea
 YTN News FM 94.5

All-news stations in Spain
Radio 5 Todo Noticias – National news station from the Spanish public broadcaster
Catalunya Informació – Catalan news station for Catalonia
Radio Andalucía Información- Regional news station for Andalusia

All-news stations in the United Kingdom
LBC News – rolling news for UK from 24/7 every 20 minutes.
News Radio UK – the UK's only 24/7 headline news station, providing news, sports, travel, business, showbiz and weather updates every 10 minutes. This station was launched in 10/10/2016, at 10am

All-news stations in Ukraine
Radio NV

See also
Radio format

Notes

References

Radio formats
Radio news